"Henry VI, Part 1" is first episode of the second series of the British television series The Hollow Crown, based on the plays Henry VI, Part 1 and Henry VI, Part 2 by William Shakespeare. The episode was produced by Rupert Ryle-Hodges and directed by Dominic Cooke, who also adapted the screenplay with Ben Power. It starred Tom Sturridge as Henry VI, Sophie Okonedo as Queen Margaret and Adrian Dunbar as Richard of York. The adaptation presents Henry VI in two parts, incorporating all three Henry VI plays. It was first broadcast on 7 May 2016 on BBC Two.

Cast

 Hugh Bonneville as Humphrey, Duke of Gloucester
 Adrian Dunbar as Richard Plantagenet, Duke of York
 Michael Gambon as Sir Edmund Mortimer
 Philip Glenister as Lord Talbot
 Sally Hawkins as Eleanor Cobham, Duchess of Gloucester
 Anton Lesser as Duke of Exeter
 Ben Miles as Earl of Somerset
 Sophie Okonedo as Queen Margaret
 Tom Sturridge as King Henry VI
 Stanley Townsend as Earl of Warwick
 Jason Watkins as Duke of Suffolk
 Samuel West as Bishop of Winchester
 Tom Beard as Sir William Lucy
 Max Bennett as John Talbot
 Tom Byam Shaw as Charles the Dauphin
 Laura Frances-Morgan as Joan of Arc
 Matthew Needham as Basset
 Lucy Robinson as Cecily, Duchess of York
 David Troughton as Duke of Anjou
 Judi Dench as Narrator

Production

The concluding cycle of plays were produced in 2015 by the same team that made the first series and were directed by the former artistic director of Royal Court Theatre and Olivier Award winner, Dominic Cooke. They were adapted by Dominic Cooke and Ben Power. The adaptation presents Henry VI in two parts, incorporating Henry VI, Part 1, Henry VI, Part 2 and Henry VI, Part 3

Executive producer Pippa Harris stated, "The critical and audience reaction to The Hollow Crown series set the bar high for Shakespeare on screen, and Neal Street (Productions) is delighted to be making the concluding part of this great history cycle. By filming the 'Henry VI' plays as well as 'Richard III', we will allow viewers to fully appreciate how such a monstrous tyrant could find his way to power, bringing even more weight and depth to this iconic character."

Once again, the production returned to Kent for The Wars of The Roses, filming at Dover Castle, Leeds Castle and Penshurst Place.

Historical inaccuracies
Both Shakespeare's plays and film adaptations based on them contain numerous historical inaccuracies and anachronisms. Furthermore, this adaptation also deviates from the plays. For example, the film omits the character of the Duke of Bedford, uncle of Henry VI and regent of France; in the film the marriage of Margaret of Anjou and Henry VI is arranged by the Earl of Somerset, instead of the Earl of Suffolk, as in Shakespeare's play and as it really happened; some lines are given to other characters or are addressed to characters other than the play.

The film, like the play, features Edmund Mortimer, 5th Earl of March. In fact, following Holinshed, Shakespeare conflated two persons in the character of "Edmund Mortimer, Earl of March": Edmund Mortimer, 5th Earl of March and his uncle Edmund Mortimer, son-in-law of Owain Glyndŵr. Neither of the two Edmund Mortimers died a decrepit old man imprisoned in the Tower of London, as depicted by Shakespeare and shown in the film.

Broadcast
The second cycle of plays aired on consecutive Saturday evenings on BBC Two commencing Saturday 7 May 2016.

Home media
A Region 2 DVD set of The Wars of the Roses was released on 20 June 2016. A Region 1 DVD set was released on 21 June 2016

Soundtrack 
The original music soundtrack from The Hollow Crown: The Wars of the Roses composed by Dan Jones was released on the Wave Theory Records label in June 2016 and performed by the BBC National Orchestra of Wales

References

External links 
 
 
 "Henry VI, Part 1" at Great Performances

2016 British television episodes
Works based on Henry VI (play)
The Hollow Crown (TV series)